Shimoda Conference (previously Japanese-American Assembly) was a series of unofficial dialogues between representatives of the United States and Japan that first began in 1967 and continued every 2–4 years until 1994. In 2011, representatives from the United States and Japan gathered to hold the New Shimoda Conference in order to revive these dialogues.

History 
The first conference took place in 1967 and was the first forum for serious, but unofficial discussion between the two nations since World War II. Hosted by the Japan Council for International Understanding (JCIE's predecessor) and the American Assembly of Columbia University the conference was attended by several Congressional members, including then Senate Majority Leader Mike Mansfield, Senator Edmund Muskie (later secretary of state), Representative Tom Foley (later Speaker of the House), and Representative Donald Rumsfeld (later secretary of defense), as well as Japanese diet members Yasuhiro Nakasone (later prime minister) and Eiichi Nagasue (later chairman of the Democratic Socialist Party).

New Shimoda Conference 
On February 22, 2011 about 50 representatives from the United States and Japan gathered at the Tokyo hotel for the New Shimoda Conference in order to revive the historic forum between the two nations. The conference commemorates the 40th anniversary of the Japan Center for International Exchange(JCIE), the independent organization that hosts the event.

Attendees

Jim Webb, Member, US Senate; Chairman, US Senate Foreign Relations Subcommittee on East Asian and Pacific Affairs; Chairman, Senate Armed Services Subcommittee on Personnel
Diana DeGette, Member, US House of Representatives
Motohisa Furukawa, Member, House of Representatives of Japan; former Deputy Chief Cabinet Secretary
Tadashi Yamamoto, President, Japan Center for International Exchange
Hitoshi Tanaka, Senior Fellow, Japan Center for International Exchange; Chairman, Institute for International Strategy; former Deputy Minister for Foreign Affairs of Japan
Ichiro Fujisaki, Ambassador of Japan to the United States
Seiji Maehara, Foreign Minister of Japan
...

Conferences 
First Shimoda Conference (1967)
Second Shimoda Conference (1969)
Third Shimoda Conference (1972)
Fourth Shimoda Conference (1977)
Fifth Shimoda Conference (1981)
Sixth Shimoda Conference (1983)
Seventh Shimoda Conference (1987)
Eighth Shimoda Conference (1990)
Ninth Shimoda Conference (1994)
New Shimoda Conference (2011)

Publications 
In addition to analysis and coverage of the forum, most of the discussions at the Shimoda Conferences are available in bilingual copies.

Discord in the Pacific: Challenges to the Japanese-American Alliance, 1972 (3rd Shimoda Conference)
The United States and Japan, 1975
Encounter at Shimoda: Search for a New Pacific Partnership, 1979 (Fourth Shimoda Conference)
The Fifth Shimoda Conference, 1981
Shimoda Report: A Continuing Dialogue on Critical Issues in U.S.-Japan Relations, 1982
Report of the 6th Shimoda Conference, 1983
Report of the 7th Shimoda Conference, 1987
Report of the 8th Shimoda Conference, 1990
Japan and the United States in Asia Pacific: The Challenges for Japan in Asia (Final Report of the Shimoda '94), 1995
Japan and the United States in Asia Pacific: The Challenges for Japan in Asia (Background Papers for the Shimoda '94), 1995

References

Further reading

External links 
Shimoda Conference, Japan Center for International Exchange
New Shimoda Conference, Japan Center for International Exchange
Opening Remarks
Tadashi Yamamoto, President, Japan Center for International Exchange (JCIE)
Hon. Diana DeGette, Member, US House of Representatives
Hon. Motohisa Furukawa, Member, House of Representatives of Japan; former Deputy Chief Cabinet Secretary
Keynote Speech
Hon. Jim Webb, Member, US Senate; Chairman, US Senate Foreign Relations Subcommittee on East Asian and Pacific Affairs; Chairman, Senate Armed Services Subcommittee on Personnel
Special Address for New Shimoda Conference
Hon. Seiji Maehara, Foreign Minister of Japan

Japan–United States relations
20th-century diplomatic conferences
20th century in international relations
21st-century diplomatic conferences (Asia-Pacific)
21st century in international relations
Diplomatic conferences in Japan